Valentin Nikolaevich Makarov (30 August 1919 — 20 May 1978) was a Soviet flying ace and career officer who rose to the rank of general, having experienced combat in Khalkhin Gol, World War II, and the Korean War. Awarded the title Hero of the Soviet Union on 28 January 1943, throughout the Second World War he totaled 28 solo and ten shared shootdowns.

References 

1919 births
1978 deaths
Soviet World War II flying aces
Heroes of the Soviet Union
Recipients of the Order of Lenin
Recipients of the Order of the Red Banner
Recipients of the Order of Alexander Nevsky
Recipients of the Order of the Red Star